Roots is an album by the Prestige All Stars nominally led by trumpeter Idrees Sulieman recorded in 1957 and released on the New Jazz label.

Reception

David Szatmary of Allmusic reviewed the album, stating: "More big-band bop with a stellar cast".

Track listing 
 "Roots" (Doug Watkins) – 27:22
 "Down by the Riverside" (Traditional) – 5:52
 "Sometimes I Feel Like a Motherless Child" (Traditional) – 9:00

Personnel 
Idrees Sulieman – trumpet
Jimmy Cleveland (tracks 2 & 3), Frank Rehak (track 1) – trombone
Pepper Adams (track 1), Cecil Payne (tracks 2 & 3) – baritone saxophone
Bill Evans (track 1), Tommy Flanagan (tracks 2 & 3) – piano
Doug Watkins – bass
Louis Hayes (track 1), Elvin Jones (tracks 2 & 3) – drums
Alonzo Levister – arranger (tracks 2 & 3)

Production
Bob Weinstock – supervisor
Rudy Van Gelder – engineer

References 

Idrees Sulieman albums
1958 albums
New Jazz Records albums
Albums produced by Bob Weinstock
Albums recorded at Van Gelder Studio